The Trusted Outlaw is a 1937 American Western film directed by Robert N. Bradbury, written by George H. Plympton and Fred Myton, and starring Bob Steele, Lois January, Joan Barclay, Earl Dwire, Charles King and Richard Cramer. It was released on May 4, 1937, by Republic Pictures.

Plot
Reformed criminal Dan Ward is trusted with getting the payrolls of Mr. Pember's workers to the mine, but is having trouble with his rival Jim Swain's gang.

Cast
Bob Steele as Dan Ward
Lois January as Molly Clark
Joan Barclay as Betty Pember
Earl Dwire as Jim Swain
Charles King as Bert Gilmore 
Richard Cramer as Rogan 
Hal Price as Mr. Pember
Frank Ball as Sheriff Bob Larimer
Budd Buster as Adler

References

External links
 

1937 films
1930s English-language films
American Western (genre) films
1937 Western (genre) films
Republic Pictures films
Films directed by Robert N. Bradbury
American black-and-white films
Films based on works by Johnston McCulley
Films with screenplays by George H. Plympton
1930s American films